Mallone v BPB Industries plc [2002] EWCA Civ 126 is a UK labour law case, concerning control of an employer's discretion.

Facts
Mr Giovanni Mallone claimed compensation for BPB plc unreasonably withdrawing his share options after being dismissed. Mallone's contract, as a managing director of BPB's Italian subsidiary, incorporated a share option, where Rule 5(b)(iii) said options be awarded to terminated employees ‘as the directors in their absolute discretion shall determine’. They had passed a resolution under an express rule of the share option scheme, which allowed award of share options to terminated employees in ‘appropriate proportion’. He claimed their exercise of discretion was unreasonable.

Judgment
The Court of Appeal held the use of the employer's discretion was unreasonable in withdrawing the share options. Rix LJ said the following.

Wilson J and Waller LJ agreed.

See also
UK labour law

Notes

References
E McGaughey, A Casebook on Labour Law (2019) 226-227

United Kingdom labour case law